Gertschosa is a genus of ground spiders that was first described by Norman I. Platnick & M. U. Shadab in 1981.

Species
 it contains four species:
Gertschosa amphiloga (Chamberlin, 1936) – USA, Mexico
Gertschosa cincta (Banks, 1929) – Panama
Gertschosa concinna (Simon, 1895) (type) – Mexico
Gertschosa palisadoes Platnick & Shadab, 1981 – Jamaica

References

Araneomorphae genera
Gnaphosidae
Spiders of North America